Lionel Jesus Gonçalves Medeiros (born 14 April 1977 in Orléans, France) is a Portuguese retired footballer who played as a central defender.

External links

1977 births
Living people
French people of Portuguese descent
Portuguese footballers
Association football defenders
US Orléans players
Primeira Liga players
Liga Portugal 2 players
Varzim S.C. players
Vitória S.C. players
Associação Académica de Coimbra – O.A.F. players
Cypriot First Division players
AC Omonia players
APOP Kinyras FC players
Portuguese expatriate footballers
Expatriate footballers in Cyprus
Portuguese expatriate sportspeople in Cyprus